The Decatur metropolitan area may refer to:

The Decatur, Alabama metropolitan area, United States
The Decatur, Illinois metropolitan area, United States
The Decatur, Indiana micropolitan area, United States

See also
Decatur (disambiguation)